Nemgiri is a place in Jintur taluka of Parbhani district of Maharashtra state of India. Nemgiri is particularly known for its Jain temple which is protected by state government and Archaeological Survey of India.

History
Nemgiri is named after twenty-second Jain tirthankara Neminatha. In Marathi language or originally in Sanskrit, Nemi is for Neminatha while giri means mountain.  There is no specific historical knowledge about this particular fort with the name Nemgiri, which Rashtrakuta kings have ruled in Jintur. However, there is some historical knowledge available about the caves. In ancient times this area was known as Jainpur, in 9th century during the time of Emperor Amoghavarsha of Rashtrakut Family. Later, in the middle period of Indian History, this was destroyed by invaders, and its name changed to Jintur, which is its current name.

At that time, 300 Jain families and 14 Jain Temples were present. Out of them, only two temples currently remain. In the year 1609 AD, this holy site was reconstructed and developed by Shri Veer Sangavi of Bagherwal Caste. It is said that "Samavsharan" of Lord Mahaveer came here, and that the last Shrut Kevali Acharya Bhadrabahu with his 1200 scholars (including Chandragupta Maurya, one of the emperors of ancient India) installed the idol of Lord Parshvanatha. The idol is said to float at a height of 3 inches. So this is called "Antariksha Parsvanath". According to archaeologists the idols of this Tirtha (holy site of Hinduism and/or Jainism) are 1000 years old or more.

Temple
Two hills, named Nemgiri and Chandragiri, are known for their ancient, artistic, and miraculous Jain Cave Temples and Chaityalayas.

There are two temples and seven caves on the two hills. The hills are named as Nemgiri and chandragiri respectively.

On Nemgiri hill there are seven caves. The caves have tiny entrances but the idols inside are quiet large. Nemgiri caves are unique examples of engineering of that era.

See also
Jainism in Maharashtra

Reference

Citations

Bibliography 
 
 

Parbhani district
Tourist attractions in Parbhani district
8th-century Jain temples
Jain temples in Maharashtra